Die Wehrmacht was a German military magazine, which was published from 1936 to 1944 to serve German Reich propaganda purposes.

It promoted the newly formed Wehrmacht, official editor was the new Oberkommando der Wehrmacht from February 1938 onwards.

Aimed at young readers, the price was only 25 Reichspfennig, and illustrated in colour, mainly by Theo Matejko. In September 1944 it was cancelled.

See also
 Der Adler - Luftwaffe equivalent
 Signal - Army equivalent
 Kriegsmarine - German Navy equivalent

References

External links
 German Federal  Bundesarchiv on „Die Wehrmacht“ 

1936 establishments in Germany
1944 disestablishments in Germany
Defunct magazines published in Germany
German-language magazines
Magazines established in 1936
Magazines disestablished in 1944
Military magazines
Wehrmacht
Nazi newspapers